Mitevski (Cyrillic: Митевска) is a Slavic masculine surname, its feminine counterpart is Mitevska. It may refer to
Aleksandar Mitevski, Macedonian singer-songwriter 
Goran Mitevski, Macedonian politician
Labina Mitevska (born 1975), Macedonian actress

Macedonian-language surnames